Hengyang Stadium is a multi-purpose stadium in Hengyang, China that is under construction.  It will be used mostly for football matches.  The stadium holds 35,000 spectators.  It was due to open in 2012 and broke ground in 2009.

References

Football venues in China
Multi-purpose stadiums in China
Stadiums under construction
Buildings and structures under construction in China
Hengyang
Sports venues in Hunan